Marina Evgenievna Cherkasova (born 17 November 1964) is a Russian retired pair skater. With Sergei Shakhrai, she won the 1979 European title at the age of 14. At 15, she was the 1980 Olympic silver medalist and 1980 World champion.

Career 
Cherkasova and Shakhrai trained in Moscow with Stanislav Zhuk. Their main rivals included fellow Soviets Irina Rodnina / Alexander Zaitsev, whom they never defeated, Irina Vorobieva / Igor Lisovsky, Marina Pestova / Stanislav Leonovich, and Veronika Pershina / Marat Akbarov. 

Cherkasova and Shakhrai were 12 and 18 respectively when they were paired together. Initially, there was a 35 cm height difference between the pair, with Cherkasova only 138 cm tall.

Cherkasova was 12 when the pair captured the bronze at their first European Championship in 1977. Their height difference facilitated innovation in twist and lift elements; they became the first pair to perform the split quadruple twist in 1977. Later, the judging standards were changed to value physical harmony between the partners, which handicapped Cherkasova and her partner.

They won the European title in 1979. By 1980 Cherkasova had grown 20 cm. The change affected their technical elements, however, the pair managed to win silver at 1980 Europeans, silver at the 1980 Olympics, and gold at Worlds. At the age of 15 years, 93 days, Cherkasova was one of the youngest figure skating Olympic medalists. 

Shakhrai's problems lifting his now 45 kg partner eventually resulted in them splitting up. By 1981, Cherkasova had grown so tall that Shakhrai could no longer effectively lift her. This caused them to miss the medal podium at the World Championship in Hartford, Connecticut, finishing in fourth place.

Cherkasova and Shakhrai continued to train into the 1982 season, however eventually broke up. She briefly paired with Rashid Kadyrkaev, a World junior medalist in 1980 and 1981, but he left to skate with Elena Kvitchenko at the invitation of Igor Moskvin in Leningrad.

Later life 
In 1982, Cherkasova joined the Moscow Ice Ballet where she met her husband. In 1986, they had a son, Vitaly, and a few years later, a daughter named Daria. Cherkasova is now a children's coach in Moscow.

Competitive highlights 
(with Shakhrai)

References

Navigation 

1964 births
Living people
Soviet female pair skaters
Russian female pair skaters
Olympic figure skaters of the Soviet Union
Figure skaters at the 1980 Winter Olympics
Olympic silver medalists for the Soviet Union
Olympic medalists in figure skating
World Figure Skating Championships medalists
European Figure Skating Championships medalists
Medalists at the 1980 Winter Olympics